The Buyid dynasty, also spelled Buwayhid, was a Shia Muslim Iranian dynasty of Daylamite origin, which mainly ruled over Iraq and central and southern Iran from 934 to 1062. Coupled with the rise of other Iranian dynasties in the region, the approximate century of Buyid rule represents the period in Iranian history sometimes called the 'Iranian Intermezzo' since, after the Muslim conquest of Persia, it was an interlude between the rule of the Abbasid Caliphate and the Seljuk Empire.

The Buyid dynasty was founded by 'Ali ibn Buya, who in 934 conquered Fars and made Shiraz his capital. His younger brother Hasan ibn Buya conquered parts of Jibal in the late 930s, and by 943 managed to capture Ray, which he made his capital. In 945, the youngest brother, Ahmad ibn Buya, conquered Iraq and made Baghdad his capital. He received the laqab or honorific title of Mu'izz al-Dawla ("Fortifier of the State"). The eldest, 'Ali, was given the title of 'Imad al-Dawla ("Support of the State"), and Hasan was given the title of Rukn al-Dawla ("Pillar of the State").

As Daylamite Iranians, the Buyids consciously revived symbols and practices of Iran's Sasanian Empire. Beginning with Imad al-Dawla, some of the Buyid rulers used the ancient Sasanian title of Shahanshah, literally "king of kings". The Buyids had many inscriptions carved at the Achaemenid ruins of Persepolis, thus suggesting a form of veneration of the site, which the Buyids thought was built by the mythical Iranian king Jamshid.

The Buyid dynasty reached its zenith under Adud al-Dawla, who is remembered for his open-mindedness and building projects such as the Band-e Amir near Shiraz. Under him, the Buyid realm stretched from the Byzantine border in Syria in the west to the borders of Khorasan in the east.

Although the Buyids were initially Zaydi Shi'a, for political advantages they became Twelver Shi'a following the Greater Occultation of the twelfth Imam in 941. Regardless, the Buyids were known for supporting the Sunni Abbasid caliphs and being tolerant of the Sunni population, who formed the majority of their realm. They were, however, unfriendly towards the Isma'ili Fatimid Caliphate of Egypt.

Contrary to the Samanids, who ruled over a mostly Sunni Muslim population in Central Asia, the Buyid realm was populated by many Zoroastrians and Christians. Because of this, many records written under the Buyids were composed in Middle Persian, Syriac and Arabic.

Origins
The word Būya (Arabic Buwayh) is a Middle Persian name ending in the diminutive  (Middle Persian -ōē, modern Persian -ūyeh, Arabic -uwayh). The Buyids were descendants of Panah-Khusrow, a Zoroastrian from Daylam. He had a son named Buya, who was a fisherman from Lahijan, and later left Zoroastrianism and converted to Islam. Buya later had three sons, named Ahmad, 'Ali, and Hasan, who would later carve out the Buyid kingdom together. The Buyids claimed royal lineage from Bahram V, the King of Kings (shahanshah) of the Sasanian Empire.

History

Rise (934–945)

The founder of the dynasty, 'Ali ibn Buya, was originally a soldier in the service of the Daylamite warlord Makan ibn Kaki, but later changed his adherence to the Iranian ruler Mardavij, who had established the Ziyarid dynasty, and was himself related to the ruling dynasty of Gilan, a region bordering Daylam. 'Ali was later joined by his two younger brothers, Hasan ibn Buya and Ahmad ibn Buya. In 932, 'Ali was given Karaj as his fief, and thus was able to enlist other Daylamites into his army. However, 'Ali's initiative proved too much for Mardavij, who planned to have him killed, but 'Ali was informed of Mardavij's plan by the latter's own vizier. The brothers, with 400 of their Daylamite supporters, then fled to Fars, where they managed to take control of Arrajan. However, the Buyids and the Abbasid general Yaqut shortly fought for control of Fars, with the Buyids eventually emerging victorious. This victory opened the way for the conquest of the capital of Fars, Shiraz.

'Ali also allied with the landowners of Fars, which included the Fasanjas family, which would later produce many prominent statesmen for the Buyids. 'Ali also enlisted more soldiers—including Turks, who were made part of the cavalry. 'Ali then sent his brother Ahmad on an expedition to Kerman, but was forced to withdraw after opposition from the Baloch people and the Qafs. However, Mardavij, who sought to depose the Abbasid caliph of Baghdad and recreate a Zoroastrian Iranian Empire, shortly wrested Khuzestan from the Abbasids and forced 'Ali to recognize him as his suzerain.

Luckily for the Buyids, Mardavij was assassinated shortly thereafter in 935, which caused chaos in the Ziyarid territories, a perfect situation for the Buyid brothers; Ali and Ahmad conquered Khuzistan, while Hasan captured the Ziyarid capital of Isfahan, and, in 943, captured Rey, which became his capital, thus conquering all of Jibal. In 945, Ahmad entered Iraq and made the Abbasid Caliph his vassal, at the same time receiving the laqab Mu'izz ad-Dawla ("Fortifier of the State"), while 'Ali was given the laqab Imād al-Dawla ("Support of the State"), and Hasan was given the laqab Rukn al-Dawla ("Pillar of the State").

Height of power and Golden age (945–983)

In addition to the other territories the Buyids had conquered, Kerman was conquered in 967, followed by Oman (967), the Jazira (979), Tabaristan (980), and Gorgan (981). After this, however, the Buyids went into a slow decline, with pieces of the confederation gradually breaking off and local dynasties under their rule becoming de facto independent.

Decline and fall (983–1062)
The death of Adud al-Dawla is considered the start of the decline of the Buyid dynasty; his son Abu Kalijar Marzuban, who was in Baghdad when he died, at first kept his death secret to ensure his succession and avoid civil war. When he eventually made the death of his father public, he was given the title of "Samsam al-Dawla". However, Adud's other son, Shirdil Abu'l-Fawaris, challenged his authority, and the feared civil war occurred anyway. Meanwhile, a Kurdish Marwanid chieftain named Badh ibn Dustak seized Diyabakr and forced Samsam al-Dawla to recognize him as the vassal ruler of the region. Furthermore, Mu'ayyad al-Dawla also died during this period, and he was succeeded by Fakhr al-Dawla, who, with the aid of Mu'ayyad al-Dawla's vizier Sahib ibn 'Abbad, became the ruler of Mu'ayyad al-Dawla's possessions. Another son of Adud al-Dawla, Abu Tahir Firuzshah, established himself as the ruler of Basra and took the title of "Diya' al-Dawla", while another son, Abu'l-Husain Ahmad, established himself as the ruler of Khuzistan, taking the title of "Taj al-Dawla".

Shirdil Abu'l-Fawaris (known by his title of "Sharaf al-Dawla") quickly seized Oman from Samsam al-Dawla, and, in 983, the Turkic troops of Samsam al-Dawla mutinied against him and some left Iraq for Fars, but most of them were persuaded by his relative Ziyar ibn Shahrakawayh to stay in Iraq. However, Iraq was in a grim state, and several rebellions occurred, which he managed to suppress, the most dangerous being that of Asfar ibn Kurdawayh, who tried to make Abu Nasr Firuz Kharshadh (known by his title of "Baha' al-Dawla") the ruler of Iraq. During the same period, Samsam al-Dawla also managed to seize Basra and Khuzistan, forcing his two brothers to flee to Fakhr al-Dawla's territory.

During the mid-11th century, the Buyid amirates gradually fell to the Ghaznavids and Seljuk Turks. In 1029, Majd al-Dawla, who was facing an uprising by his Daylami troops in Ray, requested assistance from Mahmud of Ghazna. When Sultan Mahmud arrived, he deposed Majd al-Dawla, replaced him with a Ghaznavid governor and ended the Buyid dynasty in Ray.

In 1055, Tughril conquered Baghdad, the seat of the caliphate, and ousted the last of the Buyid rulers. Like the Buyids, the Seljuks kept the Abbasid caliphs as figureheads.

Government 

The Buyids established a confederation in Iraq and western Iran. This confederation formed three principalities: one in Fars, with Shiraz as its capital, the second one in Jibal, with Ray as its capital, and the last one in Iraq, with Baghdad as its capital. However, during their late period, more principalities formed in the Buyid confederation. Succession was hereditary, with rulers dividing their land among their sons.

The title used by the Buyid rulers was amir, meaning "governor" or "prince". Generally, one of the amirs would be recognized as having seniority over the others; this individual would use the title of amir al-umara, or senior amir. Although the senior amīr was the formal head of the Būyids, he did not usually have any significant control outside of his amirate; each amir enjoyed a high degree of autonomy within his territories. As mentioned above, some stronger amirs used the Sassanid title of Shahanshah. Furthermore, several other titles such as malik ("king"), and malik al-muluk ("king of kings"), were also used by the Buyids. On a smaller scale, the Buyid territory was also ruled by princes from other families, such as the Hasanwayhids.

Military 

During the beginning of the Buyid dynasty, their army consisted mainly of their fellow Daylamites, a warlike and brave people of mostly peasant origin, who served as foot soldiers. The Daylamites had a long history of military activity dating back to the Sasanian period, and had been mercenaries in various places in Iran and Iraq, and even as far as Egypt. The Daylamites, during a battle, normally bore a sword, a shield, and three spears. Furthermore, they were also known for their formidable shield formation, which was hard to break through.

However, when the Buyid territories increased, they began recruiting Turks into their cavalry, who had played a prominent role in the Abbasid military. The Buyid army also consisted of Kurds, who, along with the Turks, were Sunnis, while the Daylamites were Shi'i Muslims. However, the army of the Buyids of Jibal was mainly composed of Daylamites.

The Daylamites and Turks often quarrelled with each other for dominance within the army. To compensate their soldiers, the Buyid amīrs often distributed iqtāʾs, or the rights to a percentage of tax revenues from a province (tax farming), although the practice of payment in kind was also frequently used. While the Turks were favoured in Buyid Iraq, the Daylamites were favoured in Buyid Iran.

Culture

Language
Contrary to the Samanids, the Buyids did not adopt Dari (also known as New Persian) as their official language. Instead, Arabic served as the lingua franca of their realm, while Middle Persian was occasionally used as a secondary court language. Although the Buyids were of Iranian stock, they supported writing in Arabic, and also used the language in their correspondence, as well as poetry. 

It is uncertain why the Buyids did not promote the use of New Persian. According to the historians Edmund Herzig and Sarah Stewart in their book Early Islamic Iran (2011), it may have been due to three factors; the Buyids had been influenced during their stay in Baghdad and thus aspired to be important supporters of Arabic writing; New Persian may have been discouraged by the Zoroastrian priests, who still wrote in Middle Persian in regions such as Fars; New Persian may have been very different/at odds with the dialects of western Iran, and was only mostly welcomed in eastern Iran. 

However, New Persian was still used as language of poetry at the Buyid courts. Many prominent poets in the Buyid realm wrote in New Persian, such as Abu Muhammad Mansur ibn Ali al-Mantiqi al-Razi, Khusrawi Sarakhsi and Abu Zayd Muhammad ibn Ali al-Ghada'iri al-Razi. The Persian vizier Sahib ibn Abbad (died 995), who was the leading figure at the Buyid court at Ray for a lengthy period, wrote only in Arabic, which he preferred instead of his native tongue. However, he also accepted New Persian panegyrics that were dedicated to him.

The Buyids also promoted the use of fahlaviyat, a designation for poetry composed in the local northwestern Iranian dialects and languages. Due to having a large Zoroastrian and Christian population, many records written under the Buyids were composed in Middle Persian, Syriac and Arabic.

Naming traditions, celebrations and identity 
While the brothers that established the Buyid kingdom had the Arabic names of Ali, Hasan, and Ahmad, the second Buyid generation notably had Iranian names, such as Kamrava, Marzuban, Bahram and Khusraw. The Buyids had many inscriptions carved at the Achaemenid ruins of Persepolis, thus suggesting a form of veneration of the site, which the Buyids thought was built by the mythical Iranian king Jamshid. Adud al-Dawla celebrated the ancient Iranian festivals of Sadeh and Mehregan, and like many previous Islamic rulers—including the caliphs—he most likely celebrated Nowruz as well. He used Nowruz as a model for two newly created festivals, which were celebrated annually in the town of Fana Khusraw-gird.

Under the Buyids, the idea of "Iranshahr" (Iran) appears in geographical works, which were all written in Arabic by mostly Iranian authors. The geographer Istakhri, who was active in the late 10th-century and wrote; "The best cultivated (ma‘mur), fairest and most fertile part of the world, and the most established in its political life is the kingdom of Iranshahr."

Herzig and Stewart adds that;

Religion
Like most Daylamites at the time, the Buyids were Shia and have been called Twelvers. However, it is likely that they began as Zaydis. Moojen Momen explains this transition from Zaydism to Twelverism, by noting that, since the Buyids were not descendants of Ali, the first Shi'i Imam, Zaydism would have required them to install an Imam from Ali's family. So, Buyids tended toward Twelverism, which has an occulted Imam, a more politically attractive option to them.

The Buyids rarely attempted to enforce a particular religious view upon their subjects except in matters where it would be politically expedient. The Sunni Abbasids retained the caliphate but were deprived of all secular power. In addition, to prevent tensions between the Shia and the Sunnis from spreading to government agencies, the Buyid amirs occasionally appointed Christians to high offices instead of Muslims from either sect.

Architecture 

Under the supervision of the Buyids, large construction and engineering projects took place, such as irrigation systems and agricultural developments, all of which led to an increase in income. In comparison to other local rulers in Iraq, particularly the Baridis and Hamdanids, it was clear that the Buyids had a liking to construction projects. When Mu'izz al-Dawla arrived in Iraq, the country had been ravaged as a result of local struggles over control of Baghdad. Under his instructions, the Baduriya dam on the Rufayl river was restored, subsequently resulting in lower prices of common foods, such as bread. This also inspired people to migrate to Baghdad.

It was during the reign of Adud al-Dawla that most of the Buyid construction and restoration projects took place. Under him, Shiraz became so crowded that the garrison had no place to roam, which led Adud al-Dawla to have a special quarter created, Fana Khusraw-gird ("Fana Khusraw made it"), a name which deliberately reflected the name of towns established by the Sasanian kings. The town of Firuzabad, considered to be linked to the Sasanian king Ardashir I, was revamped by Adud al-Dawla, possibly done in order to stress his claim to Sasanian ancestry. One of Adud al-Dawla's lasting building projects was the mausoleum erected on the burial place of Ali.

Buyid rulers

Major rulers
Generally, the three most powerful Buyid amirs at any given time were those controlling Fars, Jibal and Iraq. Sometimes a ruler would come to rule more than one region, but no Buyid rulers ever exercised direct control of all three regions.

Buyids in Fars
 Imad al-Dawla (934–949)
 'Adud al-Dawla (949–983)
 Sharaf al-Dawla (983–989)
 Samsam al-Dawla (989–998)
 Baha' al-Dawla (998–1012)
 Sultan al-Dawla (1012–1024)
 Abu Kalijar (1024–1048)
 Abu Mansur Fulad Sutun (1048–1051)
 Abu Sa'd Khusrau Shah (1051–1054)
 Abu Mansur Fulad Sutun (1051–1062)

Buyids in Ray
 Rukn al-Dawla (935–976)
 Fakhr al-Dawla (976–980)
 Mu'ayyad al-Dawla (980–983)
 Fakhr al-Dawla (restored) (984–997)
 Majd al-Dawla (997–1029)

Buyids in Iraq
 Mu'izz al-Dawla (945–967)
 'Izz al-Dawla (966–978)
 'Adud al-Dawla (978–983)
 Samsam al-Dawla (983–987)
 Sharaf al-Dawla (987–989)
 Baha' al-Dawla (989–1012)
 Sultan al-Dawla (1012–1021)
 Musharrif al-Dawla (1021–1025)
 Jalal al-Dawla (1025–1044)
 Abu Kalijar (1044–1048)
 Al-Malik al-Rahim (1048–1055)

Minor rulers
It was not uncommon for younger sons to found collateral lines, or for individual Buyid members to take control of a province and begin ruling there. The following list is incomplete.

Buyids in Basra
 Diya' al-Dawla (980s)

Buyids in Hamadan
 Mu'ayyad al-Dawla (976–983)
 Shams al-Dawla (997–1021)
 Sama' al-Dawla (1021–1024)

Buyids in Kerman
 Qawam al-Dawla (1012–1028)

Buyids of Khuzistan
 Taj al-Dawla (980s)

Family tree

See also

Iranian Intermezzo
List of kings of Persia
List of Shi'a Muslims dynasties

Notes

References

Sources

 
 
 
 
 
 
 
 
 
 Edward Granville Browne, Islamic Medicine, 2002, 
 
 
 
 
 
 
 
 
 
 
 
 
 
 
 
 

 
States and territories established in the 930s
States and territories disestablished in the 1060s
934 establishments
Medieval Iraq
Iranian dynasties
Shia dynasties